Landquart railway station is a major railway station in the municipality of Landquart, in the Swiss canton of Grisons. It is an intermediate stop on the Swiss Federal Railways Chur–Rorschach line and the junction of the Landquart–Davos Platz and Landquart–Thusis lines of the Rhaetian Railway. It is served by long-distance, local, and regional trains.

There are trains to Zürich and beyond in the north and services to Chur and Disentis/Mustér in the south. In addition, there are connecting services to Klosters, Davos and Scuol in the east.

There are currently six tracks in use at the station. Tracks 2, 3 and 4 are served by SBB and tracks 5, 6 and 8 are served by RhB.

Landquart station is the start of the Prättigauer Höhenweg, a multi-day hiking trail that leads to Klosters.

Services

Long-distance 
The following long-distance services call at Landquart:

 Intercity Express: Two round-trips per day over the Chur–Rorschach line between Hamburg and Chur.
 InterCity: Hourly service over the Chur–Rorschach line from Basel SBB or Zürich Hauptbahnhof to Chur.

Regional 
The following regional services call at Landquart:

 InterRegio:
 Hourly service over the Chur–Rorschach line between Zürich Hauptbahnhof and Chur.
 RegioExpress:
 Hourly service over the Landquart–Thusis line to Disentis/Mustér and the Landquart–Davos Platz line to Scuol-Tarasp.
 Hourly service over the Landquart–Davos Platz line to St. Moritz.
 Hourly service over the Landquart–Davos Platz line to Davos Platz.
 Regio:
 Limited service over the Landquart–Davos Platz line to Scuol-Tarasp.
 Limited service over the Landquart–Davos Platz line to Davos Platz.

Local 
Landquart is served by the S1 of the Chur S-Bahn and the S12 of the St. Gallen S-Bahn:

 : hourly service over the Landquart–Thusis line to Rhäzüns and the Landquart–Davos Platz line to Schiers.
 : half-hourly service over the Chur–Rorschach line between Sargans and Chur.

References

External links
 
 
 

Landquart, Switzerland
Railway stations in Graubünden
Rhaetian Railway stations
Swiss Federal Railways stations
Railway stations in Switzerland opened in 1858